When Women Powder Twice is a 2011–2012 South Korean television series starring Danny Ahn, Im Jung-eun, Ahn Jae-mo and Lim Yeo-won. It aired on JTBC's Monday–Friday time slot from December 5, 2011 to March 7, 2012.

Synopsis
Suzy Hamilton (Im Jung-eun), who was adopted by Americans when she was young, falls in love with Joon-soo (Kang Sung-jin) and gets pregnant. When he abandons her and goes back to South Korea, she follows him and meets a rich woman named Young-woo (Ahn Jae-mo). With her help, she prepares her revenge. During the process, she falls in love with Han Sun-woo (Danny Ahn), Young-woo's brother.

Cast

Main
 Danny Ahn as Han Sun-woo
 Im Jung-eun as Suzy Hamilton
 Ahn Jae-mo as Han Young-woo
 Lim Yeo-won

Supporting
 Kang Sung-jin as Joon-soo
 Shin Soo-yeon as So-young
 Kim Chang-sook
 Yeon Kyu-jin
 Eom Yoo-shin
 Cha Hyun-jung
 Shin Woo-chul
 Ryu Sung-hoon
 Lee Hye-ri

Original soundtrack

Production
The series was originally scheduled to air for 120 episodes but, due to the low ratings, it was cut down by 55 episodes, bringing the total number of episodes to 65.

References

External links
  
 
 

JTBC television dramas
Korean-language television shows
2011 South Korean television series debuts
2012 South Korean television series endings